Prof. Dr. Melik C. Demirel is a professor at Pennsylvania State University, and his research focuses on theory-driven functional materials synthesis and fabrication for designing novel engineering materials to produce next generation materials for an array of fields including energy, biomedicine and security/defense. He received his M.S. and B.S. degrees from Bogazici University. and Ph.D. from Carnegie Mellon University.

Publications

References

External links
Official website at Penn State

Pennsylvania State University faculty
Living people
Year of birth missing (living people)